Margate is a small seaside town on the Channel Highway between  North-West Bay and the Snug Tiers,  south of Kingston in Tasmania, Australia. It is mostly in the Kingborough Council area, with about 4% in the Huon Valley Council LGA.

Location and features
At the 2006 census, Margate had a population of 1,368. Although more people live in the immediate region around the town. Margate is part of the Kingborough Council and is a frequent 'pit-stop' for those travelling south towards Snug, Kettering or Bruny Island. Vineyards, grazing fields and stands of trees surround the town and its approaches. The town itself has a range of shops, schools and religious buildings as well as several notable features including the Dru Point Bicentennial Park on the edge of North-West Bay.

Recent history has seen Margate strongly affected by the building boom of the early 2000s with new housing developments in almost all directions. This in some ways reflects demographic themes within the population. A fair percentage of the population commute into the greater Hobart area while the rest are employed locally in either the service industry or commercial enterprises such as the Tassal fish factory or the Austal shipyard. Margate Primary school has been declared a "big winner" from the 2009 Australian federal budget, receiving $2.5 million for new buildings. However the local ABC Learning centre narrowly avoided closure.  More recently the residents of Margate were found by the Sunday Tasmanian's National Health Test, to be the "happiest in the state."

At the northern approach to Margate, just east of the Channel Highway is the final resting place of the TGR M class locomotive, MA3, also known as the Margate Train. The locomotive is 'plinthed' near a former Henry Jones IXL apple barn that is now a second hand and antique warehouse. The locomotive has a number of carriages which serve as retail outlets and a pancake cafe.

Margate is also home to the Channel Heritage Centre, a museum telling the history of life in the region around the D'Entrecasteaux Channel.

History
In 1792 Bruni D'Entrecasteaux sailed up the channel now bearing his name, charting the coastline and naming features. He named the large bay at the top of the channel North West Bay. The expedition anchored there to collect fresh water and many aborigines were observed in the area. In January 1802, the French explorer, Nicolas Baudin anchored in the bay to collect fresh water, food and wood. An observatory was set up on a small island at the mouth of the North West Bay River to observe a solar eclipse and a number of aborigines were encountered during the expedition's stay. Baudin's two ships were forced to remain in the bay because of adverse wind conditions and didn't leave until 17 February 1802.

The original Margate township was along Beach Road because coal burning steamers would bring all the supplies by sea. Margate Post Office opened on 1 July 1866. and the primary school opened in 1869. From 1906-1922, the Sandfly Colliery Tramway ran from Margate Wharf to the coal mine at Kaoota.

In June to July 2016, the town held a week of celebrations and festivals to celebrate 150 years since it was gazetted.

See also

References

External links
Margate Online Access Centre
Channel Heritage Centre
Margate Primary School
Channel Christian School

Towns in Tasmania
Southern Tasmania
Localities of Kingborough Council
Localities of Huon Valley Council